The England women's cricket team toured India in February and March 2010, playing five One Day Internationals and three Women's Twenty20 Internationals. India won the ODI series 3–2, whilst England won the T20I series 2–1.

Touring party

Full touring party:

Charlotte Edwards (captain)
Caroline Atkins
Tammy Beaumont (wicket-keeper)
Katherine Brunt
Lydia Greenway
Isa Guha
Jenny Gunn
Danielle Hazell
Laura Marsh
Beth Morgan
Ebony Rainford-Brent
Nicky Shaw
Anya Shrubsole
Sarah Taylor (wicket-keeper)
Danni Wyatt

Heather Knight replaced the injured Sarah Taylor after the first ODI.

Tour matches

50-over match: Indian Board President's XI v England

WODI series

1st ODI

2nd ODI

3rd ODI

4th ODI

5th ODI

WT20I series

1st T20I

2nd T20I

3rd T20I

References

External links
England Women tour of India 2009/10 from Cricinfo

International cricket competitions in 2009–10
India 2009-10
Women's international cricket tours of India
2010 in women's cricket